The Statute of Autonomy of Melilla is the basic institutional norm of the autonomous city of Melilla, in Spain. It is an organic law approved on 13 March 1995 and published in the Official State Gazette (Boletín Oficial del Estado) the following day, together with the equivalent of the city of Ceuta. It established Melilla as an autonomous city, because before it was a municipality belonging to the province of Málaga. It was the result of a 17-year process that originated from the Fifth Transitory Provision of the Constitution of 1978 that allowed the subsequent constitution of Ceuta and Melilla in autonomous communities.

References

Bibliography
 
 

1995 in Spain
Melilla
History of Melilla